The 2019 Danish FIM Speedway Grand Prix sponsored by Ecco was the eight race of the 2019 Speedway Grand Prix season. It took place on September 7th at the Vojens Speedway Center in Vojens, Denmark.

Riders 
First reserve Robert Lambert replaced Greg Hancock. The Speedway Grand Prix Commission nominated Mikkel Michelsen as the wild card, and Michael Jepsen Jensen and Anders Thomsen both as Track Reserves.

Results 
The Grand Prix was won by Bartosz Zmarzlik, who beat Matej Žagar, Fredrik Lindgren and Emil Sayfutdinov in the final. It was the sixth Grand Prix win of Zmarzlik's career.

Zmarzlik's win resulted in him moving clear at the top of the overall standings with 103 points. Sayfutdinov moved up to second place on 94 points, while former joint leader Leon Madsen, who failed to reach the semi-finals, dropped down to third on 92 points (see intermediate classification table below).

Heat details

Intermediate classification

References

See also 

2019
Denmark
International sports competitions hosted by Denmark
Speedway Grand Prix of Denmark
Speedway